Two Gals and a Guy, also known as Baby and Me, is a 1951 comedy film directed by Alfred E. Green and starring Janis Paige, Robert Alda, James Gleason, Lionel Stander, Arnold Stang, The Three Suns, and Patty McCormack, in her film debut.

The film was an independent production of the Weisner Brothers for Eagle-Lion Films and released by United Artists.

Plot
A singing couple (Alda and Paige) co-host a weekly television show in New York City, but a strain jeopardizes their personal and professional relationships. Della Oliver wants to adopt a child. Deke does not. Seymour, their sponsor, is threatening to rip up their new five-year contract if they don't immediately sign it.

When adoption agency officials turn up, Deke goes behind Della's back and puts on an act, making them see him as an unfit parent. Della discovers what he did and moves out. Time is running short before their next program. Deke, to his astonishment, spots a dead ringer for his wife on the street. He tracks down the woman, Sylvia Latour, and persuades her to impersonate Della on the TV show.

The scheme fools the audience from a resemblance standpoint, but Sylvia cannot remember her lines. Della takes pity on Deke and trades places, getting the program back on track. A grateful Deke not only agrees to discuss parenthood, but even how the child they have together might not need to be an adopted one.

Cast
 Robert Alda as Deke Oliver
 Janis Paige as Della Oliver
 James Gleason as Max
 Lionel Stander as Seymour
 Arnold Stang as Bernard

References

External links
 

1951 films
1951 comedy films
American comedy films
Films directed by Alfred E. Green
United Artists films
Eagle-Lion Films films
Films scored by Gail Kubik
American black-and-white films
1950s English-language films
1950s American films